Lee Robson is a former Australian rules footballer who played for West Torrens in the South Australian National Football League (SANFL).

References

External links 

West Torrens Football Club players
Australian rules footballers from South Australia
People from Whyalla
Living people
South Australian State of Origin players
Year of birth missing (living people)